The Man Who Wagged His Tail (also known as An Angel Over Brooklyn and An Angel Passed Over Brooklyn) is a  1957 Spanish-Italian fantasy-comedy film directed by Ladislao Vajda.

Plot 
Mr. Bozzi is the owner and lessor of many apartments and houses in Brooklyn's immigrant communities. He is a stubborn upstart who is only interested in his own profit and has no compassion for his tenants, who are often poor and in need. To prevent beggars from knocking or ringing his bell, he has trained himself to make dog noises. When one day a fairy tale seller appears to him, she curses him into a dog that only human love can transform back. Bozzi, pushed around, hungry, unwanted, experiences life as merciless and cold. Pursued by other dogs, chased away by people with whom he can no longer communicate, he roams the streets until he meets the boy Tonino, who takes care of him. The two become friends, and when some thugs beat up little Tonino, he jumps on the thugs to protect Tonino. Through this act of selflessness, Bozzi transforms back into human form. The inner transformation endures: from now on, Bozzi is understanding and friendly.

Cast 

Peter Ustinov: Lawyer Pozzi
Pablito Calvo: Tonino
Aroldo Tieri: Bruno Lo Banco
Maurizio Arena: Alfonso
Franca Tamantini: Alfonso's girlfriend
Silvia Marco: Giulia
Isabel de Pomés: Paolina
Carlos Casaravilla: Hobo
José Marco Davó: Judge
Renato Chiantoni: Judge's usher
Dolores Bremón: Old lady
Juan de Landa:Butcher
José Isbert: Pietrino
Julia Caba Alba: Owner of the restaurant
Enrique Diosdado: Cop
Carlo Pisacane: Tramp

References

External links

1957 films
Films directed by Ladislao Vajda
1950s fantasy comedy films
Spanish fantasy comedy films
Italian fantasy comedy films
Films set in Brooklyn
1957 comedy films
1950s Italian films
1950s Spanish films